"Need All My Friends" is a song written and performed by southern rock band Lynyrd Skynyrd. The song was recorded in 1968 and released the same year by Shade Tree Records. The song is considered to be the first song the band recorded, with their name spelled as "Lynard Skynard" on the release. The song was never released on a studio album until 2000 when MCA records released the double CD compilation of rarities called Collectybles. According to the Goldmine Price Guide to 45 RPM Records, "approximately 300 copies [were] pressed".  Another version (also included on Collectybles) was recorded in 1970 at Quinvy Studios as part of the "Quinvy Demo" that the band cut before heading to Muscle Shoals Sound Studios to record with Jimmie Johnston.

Content
The song features a softer rhythm to later songs and features Ronnie Van Zant singing about how important it is to have friends.

Notes

External links
  Lynard Skynard* – Need All My Friends, at Discogs

1968 debut singles
1968 songs
Lynyrd Skynyrd songs
Rock ballads